Countess Elena Pucić-Sorkočević, also Elena Pozza-Sorgo (c. 1784–1865) was the first female composer in the Republic of Ragusa (Dubrovnik), located in today's southern Croatia. She was born Elena Lujza Ranjina, and married Nikola Lucijan Pucić-Sorkočević (1772–1855). They had two children: Marina, who married Matej Natali and Lucijan Pucić-Sorkočević. After the fall of the Republic, musical performances were mostly held in private houses of the noble families.

See also
House of Pucić
Sorkočević family
Republic of Ragusa

References

1786 births
1865 deaths
19th-century composers
People from the Republic of Ragusa
Elena
19th-century women composers